Nikolo-Ramenye is a rural locality (a village) and the administrative center of Nikolo-Ramenskoye Rural Settlement, Cherepovetsky District, Vologda Oblast, Russia. The population was 144 as of 2002.

Geography 
Yagnitsa is the nearest rural locality.

References 

Rural localities in Cherepovetsky District